Fremantle Gas and Coke Company was a Western Australian company based in Fremantle that was bought out by the Western Australian State Electricity Commission in 1986—a component event of the WA Inc issues of the time.

It commenced operation in 1885 to power and light Fremantle.

The company had a siding from the Fremantle railway marshalling yard in the early twentieth century.

In 1952 the company constructed a new gas producer. The gasworks' main feature was its gas holding domes, which were removed in the 1980s.

In the 1960s the Fremantle Gas and Coke company served 14,440 customers in a separate market zone from the State Electricity Commission, which provided the rest of the Perth metropolitan area.

Notes

Fremantle
Companies based in Perth, Western Australia
Natural gas companies of Australia
Defunct utility companies of Western Australia
Australian companies disestablished in 1986
Energy companies disestablished in 1986
Australian companies established in 1888
Energy companies established in 1888
Defunct energy companies of Australia
Defunct electric power companies of Australia